Margarita Mikhailovna Pilikhina (June 30, 1926, Moscow – March 13, 1975, Moscow) was a Soviet-Russian cinematographer and teacher. She became an Honored Artist of the Russian Soviet Federative Socialist Republic (RSFSR) in 1965.

Biography 
Margarita Mikhailovna Pilikhina was born on June 30, 1926, in Moscow. Her great-uncle was Georgy Zhukov  (1896-1974), Marshal of the Soviet Union.

In 1950, she graduated from the camera department Gerasimov Institute of Cinematography (VGIK), the workshop of Boris Volchek). Since graduation, she was a lecturer at VGIK and since 1970 was an associate professor at the institute.

Pilikhina was director of photography at M. Gorky Film Studio beginning in 1956. Nine years later she became the director of photography at the film studio "Mosfilm". Also in 1965,  she lensed the Marlen Khutsiev classic I Am Twenty, which remains her best known work. In 1977, she published the book I Am a Cameraman.

She was a member of the Communist Party of the Soviet Union  (CPSU) since 1956. She was a member of the Board Union of Cinematographers of the USSR since 1965, then she was Secretary of the Board, Head of the Creative Section of Cameramen.

Pilikhina is buried at Novodevichy Cemetery.

Selected filmography

Camera work 
 1956 — For the Power of the Soviets (dir. Boris Buneev)
 1957 — Night Patrol (dir. Vladimir Sukhobokov)
 1959 — Foma Gordeev (dir. Mark Donskoy)
 1959 — Ryzhik (dir. Ilya Frez)
 1963 — Zastava Ilyich (dir. Marlen Khutsiev)
 1965 — I am Twenty (dir. Marlen Khutsiev)
 1966 — Daytime Stars (dir. Igor Talankin)
 1970 — Tchaikovsky (dir. Igor Talankin)
 1973 — Affairs of the Heart (dir. Azhdar Ibragimov)

Directing work 
 1975 — Anna Karenina (ballet film)

Recognition 
 1958 - All-Union Film Festival - Encouragement diploma for camera work (film "Two from the same quarter")
 1965 - Honored Art Worker of the RSFSR
 1970 - Honored Worker of Culture of the Slovak Socialist Republic
 1971 - Order of the Red Banner of Labor
 1970 - San Sebastian International Film Festival - diploma for outstanding artistic and technical qualities (film "Tchaikovsky")

References 

1926 births
1975 deaths
Honored Artists of the RSFSR
Russian cinematographers
Gerasimov Institute of Cinematography alumni
Russian educators